Ahmed Hegazi (born 1991) is an Egyptian footballer.

Ahmed Hegazi may also refer to:
 Ahmed Hegazi (actor) (1935–2002), Egyptian actor
 Ahmed Gaffer Hegazi (born 1948), Egyptian professor of microbiology and immunology